Enrico Sardi (1 April 1891 – 4 July 1969) was an Italian footballer who played as a forward. He competed at the 1912 Summer Olympics and the 1920 Summer Olympics with Italy.

References

1891 births
1969 deaths
Italian footballers
Italy international footballers
Olympic footballers of Italy
Footballers at the 1912 Summer Olympics
Footballers at the 1920 Summer Olympics
Footballers from Genoa
Association football forwards
Genoa C.F.C. players
U.S.D. Novese players
Savona F.B.C. players